Dreya Weber is an American actress, producer, director, and aerialist.

Career

Weber toured with Cher during her Living Proof farewell tour and choreographed the performances by aerialists.

She produced and starred in The Gymnast (2006) which took home 28 festival awards, including Best Feature at Outfest, Newfest and Frameline, and demonstrated her aerialist skills. She also produced and starred in A Marine Story about the US Military policy of Don't Ask, Don't Tell, and The Aerialist (2020), which is the sequel to The Gymnast.

Weber is currently represented by McDonald Selznick Associates.

Personal life
During her teenage years, Weber competed with the Mexican National Hurdling Team, ranking within the top ten. She returned from Mexico to attend Hunter College in New York City.

She performed aerial silk at the 2002 Winter Olympics in Salt Lake City.  She is friends with Tony Horton and has featured in all three of his P90X home workout series.

In a 2006 AfterEllen interview, Weber described herself as omnisexual.

She is married to Ned Farr, who directed The Gymnast, A Marine Story, and The Aerialist.

She is closely associated with the actor Frank Ferrante, alongside whom she has collaborated on several projects including Teatro ZinZanni and various productions relating to the Marx Brothers.

Filmography

Awards
 Outfest – Won, Dreya Weber – Outstanding Actress in a Feature, 2010.

See also
 List of female film and television directors
 List of LGBT-related films directed by women

References

Further reading
 The Gymnast, Metroweekly review.

External links 

 

Living people
American film actresses
American television actresses
Actresses from Indiana
Hunter College alumni
21st-century American women
Year of birth missing (living people)